Uinta Brewing Company is a craft brewery founded in 1993 in Salt Lake City, Utah, USA. The company produces a range of beers, naming them after Utah's cultural and natural icons. As of 2016, Uinta was the 39th-largest craft brewery in the country.

History
Uinta brewing company began brewing beer in the winter of 1993 in a renovated mechanics garage in Salt Lake City, Utah. Their flagship beer was Cutthroat Pale Ale, named after Utah's State Fish. This was followed by King's Peak Porter, named after Utah's highest peak; Golden Spike Hefeweizen, named after the spike used to commemorate the completion of the transcontinental railroad, which was completed in Utah; and Dubhe, named after the Utah Centennial star.

In 2001, Uinta became the first Utah company to be 100% wind powered. The company also began installing solar panels on the brewery roof in 2011.

Financing and growth

In August 2014, Uinta announced that it sold a percentage of the company to New York-based private equity firm The Riverside Company for an undisclosed amount. Uinta CEO Will Hamill stated that the capital raised would be used to hire new employees, and expand beyond the Salt Lake City region.

Uinta has seen accelerated growth since 2012. Uinta stated that it sold 60,000 barrels of beer in 2013, and 77,000 barrels in 2014.

As of March 2015, Uinta beers are sold in 32 states and Washington, D.C. This number has declined however, as they have withdrawn from multiple states during the second half of the 202nd decade.

Products

Year Round Brews 

 Cutthroat Pale Ale/Uinta Pale Ale 4% ABV
 Hop Nosh IPA 7.3% ABV
 Hop Nosh Tangerine IPA 7.3% ABV
 Detour Double IPA 9.5% ABV
 Golden Ale 5% ABV
 Pils Pilsner 5% ABV
 Baba Black Lager 4% ABV
 Ready Set Gose 4% ABV
 Piggy Back Session Peach IPA 4% ABV
 801 Pilsner 4% ABV
 Wyld Simcoe Session Ale 4% ABV
 Golden Spike Hefeweizen 4% ABV
 Trader Session IPA 4% ABV
 Hoodoo Kolsch Golden Ale 4% ABV
 Bristlecone Brown Ale 4% ABV

Seasonal Brews 

 Yardsale Winter Lager 4% ABV
 Season Pass Vanilla Porter 4% ABV
 Rise & Pine Hoppy Dark Ale 7.5% ABV
 Farmside Saison 5.6% ABV
 Punk'n Pumpkin Ale 4% ABV
 Flamingose Pineapple Gose 4% ABV

Limited Small-Batch Brews 

 Anniversary Barley Wine 10.4% ABV
 Dubhe Imperial Black IPA 9.2% ABV
 Monkshine Belgian Style Blonde Ale 6% ABV
 Fest Helles German Style Lager 5.7% ABV
 801 Coffee Pilsner 4% ABV
 Cutthroat+ Winter Pale Ale 4% ABV
 Cockeyed Cooper
 Sum'r
 Birthday Suit

Brett (Brettanomyces) Brews 

 Funk'n Patch Pumpkin Ale 8% ABV
 Croggy Saison 6.8% ABV
 Sea Legs Baltic Porter 8.2% ABV
 Hopscursion IPA 6.5% ABV

Retired Brews 

 Hazel
 Contrail
 Kings Peak
 Skipping Stone

Their Hop Nosh IPA was designated "world class" by Beer Advocate.

References

External links

Manufacturing companies based in Salt Lake City
Beer brewing companies based in Utah
Companies established in 1993
Privately held companies based in Utah
1993 establishments in Utah